Mighty Instrumentals is the eleventh studio album by American musician James Brown. It consists of instrumentals recorded during his time with the King label. The album was released in 1966.

Track listing

References

James Brown albums
1966 albums
Albums produced by James Brown
King Records (United States) albums